Connor Thomas Pain (born 11 November 1993) is an Australian professional football (soccer) player who plays as a forward for Western United. He signed his first professional contract in March 2013 for Melbourne Victory.

Pain has made one appearance for Australia, in 2013 against China.

Early life

Pain's grandfather Tommy Casey played in Newcastle United's 1955 FA Cup Finalwinning team and for the Northern Ireland team which reached the quarter finals of the 1958 FIFA World Cup.

His father, Craig Pain, was a rugby union player who played in the Hong Kong Sevens Rugby Tournament between 1987 and 1993 and coached Hong Kong in the 2002 tournament. Pain went to Beaumaris Primary School.

Club career

Melbourne Victory
Pain made his A-League debut for Melbourne Victory in a Melbourne Derby against Melbourne Heart on 2 February 2013.

He made his first start for the club a week later, against Central Coast Mariners.

In 2013, he was singled out for praise by then-Liverpool manager Brendan Rodgers after a friendly match at the Melbourne Cricket Ground.

Central Coast Mariners
Pain moved to the Central Coast Mariners in June 2016 in a swap deal for Mitch Austin.
Pain made his debut for the Mariners against Perth Glory on 8 October 2016, putting on a man of the match performance in an eventual 3–3 draw.  He scored his first goal for the club in a win over Adelaide United one month later with a powerful strike from outside the area.

Western United
On 14 April 2019 Pain signed for new A-League club, Western United.

International career

Youth
Pain was first called up to the Australian under-20 side for a tour of Europe in May 2013. He made his debut for the Young Socceroos in that tour, starting in a loss to the Netherlands in Emmen. He was subsequently selected in the squad for the 2013 FIFA U-20 World Cup. Pain played in all three of Australia's games in the tournament as they were eliminated in the group stage.

Pain was named in the Australia under-23 squad for the 2013 AFC U-22 Championship. He played his first game for the Olyroos in a group stage win over Iran. In March 2016, Pain scored a double for the team in a win over Hong Kong in 2016 AFC U-23 Championship qualification. He was later named in the squad for the final tournament.

Senior
Following the 2013 FIFA U-20 World Cup, in July 2013 Pain received his first call up for Australia for the 2013 EAFF East Asian Cup in South Korea. He and Melbourne Victory teammate Nathan Coe left the squad midway through the tournament for a club friendly against Liverpool. Nonetheless, Pain returned for the final game of the tournament against China and made his debut as a second-half substitute in a 4–3 loss.

Personal life
Pain is currently studying a Bachelor of Commerce at Deakin University.

Honours

Club
Melbourne Victory:
 A-League Championship: 2014–2015
 A-League Premiership: 2014–2015 
 FFA Cup: 2015

Western United
A-League Men Championship: 2021–22

References

External links
 
 

1993 births
Living people
Association football forwards
Australian soccer players
Hong Kong footballers
A-League Men players
Victorian Premier League players
Melbourne Victory FC players
Central Coast Mariners FC players
Western United FC players
Australian people of English descent
Australian people of Northern Ireland descent
Australia international soccer players
Australia under-20 international soccer players